Scorpions are predatory arachnids of the order Scorpiones. They have eight legs, and are easily recognized by a pair of grasping pincers and a narrow, segmented tail, often carried in a characteristic forward curve over the back and always ending with a stinger. The evolutionary history of scorpions goes back 435 million years. They mainly live in deserts but have adapted to a wide range of environmental conditions, and can be found on all continents except Antarctica. There are over 2,500 described species, with 22 extant (living) families recognized to date. Their taxonomy is being revised to account for 21st-century genomic studies.

Scorpions primarily prey on insects and other invertebrates, but some species hunt vertebrates. They use their pincers to restrain and kill prey, or to prevent their own predation. The venomous sting is used for offense and defense. During courtship, the male and female grasp each other's pincers and dance while he tries to move her onto his sperm packet. All known species give live birth and the female cares for the young as their exoskeletons harden, transporting them on her back. The exoskeleton contains fluorescent chemicals and glows under ultraviolet light.

The vast majority of species do not seriously threaten humans, and healthy adults usually do not need medical treatment after a sting. About 25 species (fewer than one percent) have venom capable of killing a human, which happens frequently in the parts of the world where they live, primarily where access to medical treatment is unlikely.

Scorpions appear in art, folklore, mythology, and commercial brands. Scorpion motifs are woven into kilim carpets for protection from their sting. Scorpius is the name of a constellation; the corresponding astrological sign is Scorpio. A classical myth about Scorpius tells how the giant scorpion and its enemy Orion became constellations on opposite sides of the sky.

Etymology
"shear".

Evolution

Fossil record

Scorpion fossils have been found in many strata, including marine Silurian and estuarine Devonian deposits, coal deposits from the Carboniferous Period and in amber. Whether the early scorpions were marine or terrestrial has been debated, though they had book lungs like modern terrestrial species. Over 100 fossil species of scorpion have been described. The oldest found as of 2021 is Dolichophonus loudonensis, which lived during the Silurian, in present-day Scotland. Gondwanascorpio from the Devonian is among the earliest-known terrestrial animals on the Gondwana supercontinent. Some Palaeozoic scorpions possessed compound eyes similar to those of eurypterids. The Triassic fossils Protochactas and Protobuthus belong to the modern clades Chactoidea and Buthoidea respectively, indicating that the crown group of modern scorpions had emerged by this time.

Phylogeny
The Scorpiones are a clade within the pulmonate Arachnida (those with book lungs). Arachnida is placed within the Chelicerata, a subphylum of Arthropoda that contains sea spiders and horseshoe crabs, alongside terrestrial animals without book lungs such as ticks and harvestmen. The extinct Eurypterida, sometimes called sea scorpions, though they were not all marine, are not scorpions; their grasping pincers were chelicerae, not homologous with the pincers (second appendages) of scorpions. Scorpiones is sister to the Tetrapulmonata, a terrestrial group of pulmonates containing the spiders and whip scorpions. This 2019 cladogram summarizes:

Recent studies place pseudoscorpions as the sister group of scorpions in the clade Panscorpiones, which together with Tetrapulmonata makes up the clade Arachnopulmonata.

The internal phylogeny of the scorpions has been debated, but genomic analysis consistently places the Bothriuridae as sister to a clade consisting of Scorpionoidea and Chactoidea. The scorpions diversified between the Devonian and the early Carboniferous. The main division is into the clades Buthida and Iurida. The Bothriuridae diverged starting before temperate Gondwana broke up into separate land masses, completed by the Jurassic. The Iuroidea and Chactoidea are both seen not to be single clades, and are shown as "paraphyletic" (with quotation marks) in this 2018 cladogram.

Taxonomy

Carl Linnaeus described six species of scorpion in his genus Scorpio in 1758 and 1767; three of these are now considered valid and are called Scorpio maurus, Androctonus australis, and Euscorpius carpathicus; the other three are dubious names. He placed the scorpions among his "Insecta aptera" (wingless insects), a group that included Crustacea, Arachnida and Myriapoda. In 1801, Jean-Baptiste Lamarck divided up the "Insecta aptera", creating the taxon Arachnides for spiders, scorpions, and acari (mites and ticks), though it also contained the Thysanura (thrips), Myriapoda and parasites such as lice. German arachnologist Carl Ludwig Koch created the order Scorpiones in 1837. He divided it into four families, the six-eyed scorpions "Scorpionides", the eight-eyed scorpions "Buthides", the ten-eyed scorpions "Centrurides", and the twelve-eyed scorpions "Androctonides".

More recently, some twenty-two families containing over 2,500 species of scorpions have been described, with many additions and much reorganization of taxa in the 21st century. There are over 100 described taxa of fossil scorpions. This classification is based on Soleglad and Fet (2003), which replaced Stockwell's older, unpublished classification. Further taxonomic changes are from papers by Soleglad et al. (2005).

The extant taxa to the rank of family (numbers of species in parentheses) are:

 Order Scorpiones

 Parvorder Pseudochactida Soleglad & Fet, 2003

 Superfamily Pseudochactoidea Gromov, 1998
 Family Pseudochactidae Gromov, 1998 (1 sp.) (Central Asian scorpions of semi-savanna habitats)

 Parvorder Buthida Soleglad & Fet, 2003

 Superfamily Buthoidea C. L. Koch, 1837
 Family Buthidae C. L. Koch, 1837 (1209 spp.) (thick-tailed scorpions, including the most dangerous species)
 Family Microcharmidae Lourenço, 1996, 2019 (17 spp.) (African scorpions of humid forest leaf litter)

 Parvorder Chaerilida Soleglad & Fet, 2003

 Superfamily Chaeriloidea Pocock, 1893
 Family Chaerilidae Pocock, 1893 (51 spp.) (South and Southeast Asian scorpions of non-arid places)

 Parvorder Iurida Soleglad & Fet, 2003

 Superfamily Chactoidea Pocock, 1893
 Family Akravidae Levy, 2007 (1 sp.) (cave-dwelling scorpions of Israel)
 Family Belisariidae Lourenço, 1998 (3 spp.) (cave-related scorpions of Southern Europe)
 Family Chactidae Pocock, 1893 (209 spp.) (New World scorpions, membership under revision)
 Family Euscorpiidae Laurie, 1896 (170 spp.) (harmless scorpions of the Americas, Eurasia, and North Africa)
 Family Superstitioniidae Stahnke, 1940 (1 sp.) (cave scorpions of Mexico and Southwestern United States)
 Family Troglotayosicidae Lourenço, 1998 (4 spp.) (cave-related scorpions of South America)
 Family Typhlochactidae Mitchell, 1971 (11 spp.) (cave-related scorpions of Eastern Mexico)
 Family Vaejovidae Thorell, 1876 (222 spp.) (New World scorpions)

 Superfamily Iuroidea Thorell, 1876
 Family Caraboctonidae Kraepelin, 1905 (23 spp.) (hairy scorpions)
 Family Hadruridae Stahnke, 1974 (9 spp.) (large North American scorpions)
 Family Iuridae Thorell, 1876 (21 spp.) (scorpions with a large tooth on inner side of moveable claw)

 Superfamily Scorpionoidea Latreille, 1802
 Family Bothriuridae Simon, 1880 (158 spp.) (Southern hemisphere tropical and temperate scorpions)
 Family Hemiscorpiidae Pocock, 1893 (16 spp.) (rock, creeping, or tree scorpions of the Middle East)
 Family Hormuridae Laurie, 1896 (92 spp.) (flattened, crevice-living scorpions of Southeast Asia and Australia)
 Family Rugodentidae Bastawade et al., 2005 (1 sp.) (burrowing scorpions of India)
 Family Scorpionidae Latreille, 1802 (183 spp.) (burrowing or pale-legged scorpions)
 Family Diplocentridae Karsch, 1880 (134 spp.) (closely related to and sometimes placed in Scorpionidae, but have spine on telson)
 Family Heteroscorpionidae Kraepelin, 1905 (6 spp.) (scorpions of Madagascar)

Geographical distribution 
Scorpions are found on all continents except Antarctica. The diversity of scorpions is greatest in subtropical areas; it decreases toward the poles and equator, though scorpions are found in the tropics. Scorpions did not occur naturally in Great Britain but were accidentally introduced by humans, and have now established a population. New Zealand, and some of the islands in Oceania, have in the past had small populations of introduced scorpions, but they were exterminated. Five colonies of Euscorpius flavicaudis have established themselves since the late 19th century in Sheerness in England at 51°N, while Paruroctonus boreus lives as far north as Red Deer, Alberta, at 52°N. A few species are on the IUCN Red List; Lychas braueri is classed as critically endangered (2014), Isometrus deharvengi as endangered (2016) and Chiromachus ochropus as vulnerable (2014).

Scorpions are xerocoles, meaning they primarily live in deserts, but they can be found in virtually every terrestrial habitat including high-elevation mountains, caves, and intertidal zones. They are largely absent from boreal ecosystems such as the tundra, high-altitude taiga, and mountain tops.

As regards microhabitats, scorpions may be ground-dwelling, tree-loving, rock-loving or sand-loving. Some species, such as Vaejovis janssi, are versatile and are found in all habitats on Socorro Island, Baja California, while others such as Euscorpius carpathicus, endemic to the littoral zone of rivers in Romania, occupy specialized niches.

Morphology

Scorpions range in size from the  Typhlochactas mitchelli of Typhlochactidae, to the  Heterometrus swammerdami of Scorpionidae. The body of a scorpion is divided into two parts or tagmata: the cephalothorax or prosoma, and the abdomen or opisthosoma. The opisthosoma is subdivided into a broad anterior portion, the mesosoma or pre-abdomen, and a narrow tail-like posterior, the metasoma or post-abdomen. External differences between the sexes are not obvious in most species. In some, the metasoma is more elongated in males than females.

Cephalothorax
The cephalothorax comprises the carapace, eyes, chelicerae (mouth parts), pedipalps (which have chelae, commonly called claws or pincers) and four pairs of walking legs. Scorpions have two eyes on the top of the cephalothorax, and usually two to five pairs of eyes along the front corners of the cephalothorax. While unable to form sharp images, their central eyes are amongst the most light sensitive in the animal kingdom, especially in dim light, which makes it possible for nocturnal species to use starlight to navigate at night. The chelicerae are at the front and underneath the carapace. They are pincer-like and have three segments and sharp "teeth". The brain of a scorpion is in the back of the cephalothorax, just above the esophagus. As in other arachnids, the nervous system is highly concentrated in the cephalothorax, but has a long ventral nerve cord with segmented ganglia which may be a primitive trait.

The pedipalp is a segmented, clawed appendage used for prey immobilization, defense and sensory purposes. The segments of the pedipalp (from closest to the body outward) are coxa, trochanter, femur, patella, tibia (including the fixed claw and the manus) and tarsus (moveable claw). A scorpion has darkened or granular raised linear ridges, called "keels" or "carinae" on the pedipalp segments and on other parts of the body; these are useful as taxonomic characters. Unlike those of some other arachnids, the legs have not been modified for other purposes, though they may occasionally be used for digging, and females may use them to catch emerging young. The legs are covered in proprioceptors, bristles and sensory setae. Depending on the species, the legs may have spines and spurs.

Mesosoma

The mesosoma or preabdomen is the broad part of the opisthosoma. In the early stages of embryonic development the mesosoma consist of eight segments, but the first segment disappear before birth, so the mesosoma in scorpions actually consist of segments 2-8. These anterior seven somites (segments) of the opisthosoma are each covered dorsally by a sclerotized plate called the tergite. Ventrally, somites 3 to 7 are armored with matching plates called sternites. The ventral side of somite 1 has a pair of genital opercula covering the gonopore. Sternite 2 forms the basal plate bearing the pectines, which function as sensory organs.

The next four somites, 3 to 6, all bear pairs of spiracles. They serve as openings for the scorpion's respiratory organs, known as book lungs. The spiracle openings may be slits, circular, elliptical or oval according to the species. There are thus four pairs of book lungs; each consists of some 140 to 150 thin lamellae filled with air inside a pulmonary chamber, connected on the ventral side to an atrial chamber which opens into a spiracle. Bristles hold the lamellae apart. A muscle opens the spiracle and widens the atrial chamber; dorsoventral muscles contract to compress the pulmonary chamber, forcing air out, and relax to allow the chamber to refill. The 7th and last somite does not bear appendages or any other significant external structures.

The mesosoma contains the heart or "dorsal vessel" which is the center of the scorpion's open circulatory system. The heart is continuous with a deep arterial system which spreads throughout the body. Sinuses return deoxygenated blood (hemolymph) to the heart; the blood is re-oxygenated by cardiac pores. The mesosoma also contains the reproductive system. The female gonads are made of three or four tubes that run parallel to each other and are connected by two to four transverse anastomoses. These tubes are the sites for both oocyte formation and embryonic development. They connect to two oviducts which connect to a single atrium leading to the genital orifice. Males have two gonads made of two cylindrical tubes with a ladder-like configuration; they contain cysts which produce spermatozoa. Both tubes end in a spermiduct, one on each side of the mesosoma. They connect to glandular symmetrical structures called paraxial organs, which end at the genital orifice. These secrete chitin-based structures which come together to form the spermatophore.

Metasoma

The "tail" or metasoma consists of five segments and the telson, which is not strictly a segment. The five segments are merely body rings; they lack apparent sterna or terga, and become larger distally. These segments have keels, setae and bristles which may be used for taxonomic classification. The anus is at the distal and ventral end of the last segment, and is encircled by four anal papillae and the anal arch. The tails of some species contain light receptors.

The telson includes the vesicle, which contains a symmetrical pair of venom glands. Externally it bears the curved stinger, the hypodermic aculeus, equipped with sensory hairs. Each of the venom glands has its own duct to convey its secretion along the aculeus from the bulb of the gland to immediately near of the tip, where each of the paired ducts has its own venom pore. An extrinsic muscle system in the tail moves it forward and propels and penetrates with the aculeus, while an intrinsic muscle system attached to the glands pumps venom through the stinger into the intended victim. The stinger contains metalloproteins with zinc, hardening the tip. The optimal stinging angle is around 30 degrees relative to the tip.

Biology

Most scorpion species are nocturnal or crepuscular, finding shelter during the day in burrows, cracks in rocks and tree bark. Many species dig a shelter underneath stones a few centimeters long. Some may use burrows made by other animals including spiders, reptiles and small mammals. Other species dig their own burrows which vary in complexity and depth. Digging is done using the mouth parts, claws and legs. In several species, particularly of the family Buthidae, individuals may gather in the same shelter; bark scorpions may aggregate up to 30 individuals. In some species, families of females and young sometimes aggregate.

Scorpions can withstand intense heat: Leiurus quinquestriatus, Scorpio maurus and Hadrurus arizonensis can live in temperatures of  if they are sufficiently hydrated. Scorpions that live outside deserts prefer lower temperatures. The ability to resist cold may be related to the increase in the sugar trehalose when the temperature drops. Some species hibernate. Scorpions appear to have resistance to ionizing radiation. This was discovered in the early 1960s when scorpions were found to be among the few animals to survive nuclear tests at Reggane, Algeria.

Desert scorpions have several adaptations for water conservation. They excrete insoluble compounds such as xanthine, guanine, and uric acid, not requiring water for their removal from the body. Guanine is the main component and maximizes the amount of nitrogen excreted. A scorpion's cuticle holds in moisture via lipids and waxes from epidermal glands, and protects against ultraviolet radiation. Even when dehydrated, a scorpion can tolerate high osmotic pressure in its blood. Desert scorpions get most of their moisture from the food they eat but some can absorb water from the humid soil. Species that live in denser vegetation and in more moderate temperatures will drink water on plants and in puddles.

A scorpion uses its stinger both for killing prey and defense. Some species make direct, quick strikes with their tails while others make slower, more circular strikes which can more easily return the stinger to a position where it can strike again.

Mortality and defense
Scorpions may be attacked by other arthropods like ants, spiders, solifugids and centipedes. Major predators include frogs, lizards, snakes, birds, and mammals. Meerkats are somewhat specialized in preying on scorpions, biting off their stingers and being immune to their venom. Other predators adapted for hunting scorpions include the grasshopper mouse and desert long-eared bat, which are also immune to their venom. In one study, 70% of the latter's droppings contained scorpion fragments. Scorpions host parasites including mites, scuttle flies, nematodes and some bacteria. The immune system of scorpions gives them resistance to infection by many types of bacteria.

When threatened, a scorpion raises its claws and tail in a defensive posture. Some species stridulate to warn off predators by rubbing certain hairs, the stinger or the claws. Certain species have a preference for using either the claws or stinger as defense, depending on the size of the appendages. Some Ananteris species can shed parts of their tail to escape predators. The parts do not grow back, leaving them unable to sting and defecate, but they can still catch small prey and reproduce for at least eight months afterward.

Diet and feeding

Scorpions generally prey on insects, particularly grasshoppers, crickets, termites, beetles and wasps. Other prey include spiders, solifugids, woodlice and even small vertebrates including lizards, snakes and mammals. Species with large claws may prey on earthworms and mollusks. The majority of species are opportunistic and consume a variety of prey though some may be highly specialized; Isometroides vescus specializes on burrowing spiders. Prey size depends on the size of the species. Several scorpion species are sit-and-wait predators, which involves them waiting for prey at or near the entrance to their burrow. Others actively seek them out. Scorpions detect their prey with mechanoreceptive and chemoreceptive hairs on their bodies and capture them with their claws. Small animals are merely killed with the claws, particularly by large-clawed species. Larger and more aggressive prey is given a sting.

Scorpions, like other arachnids, digest their food externally. The chelicerae, which are very sharp, are used to pull small amounts of food off the prey item into a pre-oral cavity below the chelicerae and carapace. The digestive juices from the gut are egested onto the food, and the digested food is then sucked into the gut in liquid form. Any solid indigestible matter (such as exoskeleton fragments) is trapped by setae in the pre-oral cavity and ejected. The sucked-in food is pumped into the midgut by the pharynx, where it is further digested. The waste passes through the hindgut and out of the anus. Scorpions can consume large amounts of food during one meal. They have an efficient food storage organ and a very low metabolic rate, and a relatively inactive lifestyle. This enables some to survive six to twelve months of starvation.

Mating

Most scorpions reproduce sexually, with male and female individuals; species in some genera, such as Hottentotta and Tityus, and the species Centruroides gracilis, Liocheles australasiae, and Ananteris coineaui have been reported, not necessarily reliably, to reproduce through parthenogenesis, in which unfertilized eggs develop into living embryos. Receptive females produce pheromones which are picked up by wandering males using their pectines to comb the substrate. Males begin courtship by moving their bodies back and forth, without moving the legs, a behavior known as juddering. This appears to produce ground vibrations that are picked up by the female.

The pair then make contact using their pedipalps, and perform a dance called the promenade à deux (French for "a walk for two"). In this dance, the male and female move back and forth while facing each other, as the male searches for a suitable place to deposit his spermatophore. The courtship ritual can involve several other behaviors such as a cheliceral kiss, in which the male and female grasp each other's mouth-parts, arbre droit ("upright tree") where the partners elevate their posteriors and rub their tails together, and sexual stinging, in which the male stings the female in the chelae or mesosoma to subdue her. The dance can last from a few minutes to several hours.

When the male has located a suitably stable substrate, such as hard ground, agglomerated sand, rock, or tree bark, he deposits the spermatophore and guides the female over it. This allows the spermatophore to enter her genital opercula, which triggers release of the sperm, thus fertilizing the female. A mating plug then forms in the female to prevent her from mating again before the young are born. The male and female then abruptly separate. Sexual cannibalism after mating has only been reported anecdotally in scorpions.

Birth and development

Gestation in scorpions can last for over a year in some species. They have two types of embryonic development; apoikogenic and katoikogenic. In the apoikogenic system, which is mainly found in the Buthidae, embryos develop in yolk-rich eggs inside follicles. The katoikogenic system is documented in Hemiscorpiidae, Scorpionidae and Diplocentridae, and involves the embryos developing in a diverticulum which has a teat-like structure for them to feed though. Unlike the majority of arachnids, which are oviparous, hatching from eggs, scorpions seem to be universally viviparous, with live births. They are unusual among terrestrial arthropods in the amount of care a female gives to her offspring. The size of a brood varies by species, from 3 to over 100. The body size of scorpions is not correlated either with brood size or with life cycle length.

Before giving birth, the female elevates the front of her body and positions her pedipalps and front legs under her to catch the young ("birth basket"). The young emerge one by one from the genital opercula, expel the embryonic membrane, if any, and are placed on the mother's back where they remain until they have gone through at least one molt. The period before the first molt is called the pro-juvenile stage; the young are unable to feed or sting, but have suckers on their tarsi, used to hold on to their mother. This period lasts 5 to 25 days, depending on the species. The brood molt for the first time simultaneously in a process that lasts 6 to 8 hours, marking the beginning of the juvenile stage.

Juvenile stages or instars generally resemble smaller versions of adults, with fully developed pincers, hairs and stingers. They are still soft and lack pigments, and thus continue to ride on their mother's back for protection. They become harder and more pigmented over the next couple of days. They may leave their mother temporarily, returning when they sense potential danger. Once the exoskeleton is fully hardened, the young can hunt prey on their own and may soon leave their mother. A scorpion may molt six times on average before reaching maturity, which may not occur until it is 6 to 83 months old, depending on the species. Some species may live up to 25 years.

Fluorescence

Scorpions glow a vibrant blue-green when exposed to certain wavelengths of ultraviolet light, such as that produced by a black light, due to fluorescent chemicals such as beta-carboline in the cuticle. Accordingly, a hand-held ultraviolet lamp has long been a standard tool for nocturnal field surveys of these animals. Fluorescence occurs as a result of sclerotization and increases in intensity with each successive instar. This fluorescence may have an active role in the scorpion's ability to detect light.

Relationship with humans

Stings

Scorpion venom serves to kill or paralyze prey rapidly. The stings of many species are uncomfortable, but only 25 species have venom that is deadly to humans. Those species belong to the family Buthidae, including Leiurus quinquestriatus, Hottentotta spp., Centruroides spp., and Androctonus spp. People with allergies are especially at risk; otherwise, first aid is symptomatic, with analgesia. Cases of very high blood pressure are treated with medications that relieve anxiety and relax the blood vessels. Scorpion envenomation with high morbidity and mortality is usually due to either excessive autonomic activity and cardiovascular toxic effects, or neuromuscular toxic effects. Antivenom is the specific treatment for scorpion envenomation combined with supportive measures including vasodilators in patients with cardiovascular toxic effects, and benzodiazepines when there is neuromuscular involvement. Although rare, severe hypersensitivity reactions including anaphylaxis to scorpion antivenin are possible.

Scorpion stings are a public health problem, particularly in the tropical and subtropical regions of the Americas, North Africa, the Middle East and India. Around 1.5 million scorpion envenomations occur each year with around 2,600 deaths. Mexico is one of the most affected countries, with the highest biodiversity of scorpions in the world, some 200,000 envenomations per year and at least 300 deaths.

Efforts are made to prevent envenomation and to control scorpion populations. Prevention encompasses personal activities such as checking shoes and clothes before putting them on, not walking in bare feet or sandals, and filling in holes and cracks where scorpions might nest. Street lighting reduces scorpion activity. Control may involve the use of insecticides such as pyrethroids, or gathering scorpions manually with the help of ultraviolet lights. Domestic predators of scorpions, such as chickens and turkeys, can help to reduce the risk to a household.

Potential medicinal use

Scorpion venom is a mixture of neurotoxins; most of these are peptides, chains of amino acids. Many of them interfere with membrane channels that transport sodium, potassium, calcium, or chloride ions. These channels are essential for nerve conduction, muscle contraction and many other biological processes. Some of these molecules may be useful in medical research and might lead to the development of new disease treatments. Among their potential therapeutic uses are as analgesic, anti-cancer, antibacterial, antifungal, antiviral, antiparasitic, bradykinin-potentiating, and immunosuppressive drugs. As of 2020, no scorpion toxin-based drug is for sale, though chlorotoxin is being trialled for use against glioma, a brain cancer.

Consumption
Scorpions are eaten by people in West Africa, Myanmar and East Asia. Fried scorpion is traditionally eaten in Shandong, China. There, scorpions can be cooked and eaten in a variety of ways, including roasting, frying, grilling, raw, or alive. The stingers are typically not removed, since direct and sustained heat negates the harmful effects of the venom. In Thailand, scorpions are not eaten as often as other arthropods, such as grasshoppers, but they are sometimes fried as street food. They are used in Vietnam to make snake wine (scorpion wine).

Pets
Scorpions are often kept as pets. They are relatively simple to keep, the main requirements being a secure enclosure such as a glass terrarium with a lockable lid and the appropriate temperature and humidity for the chosen species, which typically means installing a heating mat and spraying regularly with a little water. The substrate needs to resemble that of the species' natural environment, such as peat for forest species, or lateritic sand for burrowing desert species. Scorpions in the genera Pandinus and Heterometrus are docile enough to handle. A large Pandinus may consume up to three crickets each week. Cannibalism is more common in captivity than in the wild and can be minimized by providing many small shelters within the enclosure and ensuring there is plenty of prey. The pet trade has threatened wild populations of some scorpion species, particularly Androctonus australis and Pandinus imperator.

Culture

The scorpion is a culturally significant animal, appearing as a motif in art, especially in Islamic art in the Middle East.
A scorpion motif is often woven into Turkish kilim flatweave carpets, for protection from their sting. The scorpion is perceived both as an embodiment of evil and as a protective force such as a dervish's powers to combat evil. In Muslim folklore, the scorpion portrays human sexuality. Scorpions are used in folk medicine in South Asia, especially in antidotes for scorpion stings.

One of the earliest occurrences of the scorpion in culture is its inclusion, as Scorpio, in the 12 signs of the Zodiac by Babylonian astronomers during the Chaldean period. This was then taken up by western astrology; in astronomy the corresponding constellation is named Scorpius.
In ancient Egypt, the goddess Serket, who protected the Pharaoh, was often depicted as a scorpion.
In ancient Greece, a warrior's shield sometimes carried a scorpion device, as seen in red-figure pottery from the 5th century BC. In Greek mythology, Artemis or Gaia sent a giant scorpion to kill the hunter Orion, who had said he would kill all the world's animals. Orion and the scorpion both became constellations; as enemies they were placed on opposite sides of the world, so when one rises in the sky, the other sets. Scorpions are mentioned in the Bible and the Talmud as symbols of danger and maliciousness.

The fable of The Scorpion and the Frog has been interpreted as showing that vicious people cannot resist hurting others, even when it is not in their interests. More recently, the action in John Steinbeck's 1947 novella The Pearl centers on a poor pearl fisherman's attempts to save his infant son from a scorpion sting, only to lose him to human violence. Scorpions have equally appeared in western artforms including film and poetry: the surrealist filmmaker Luis Buñuel made symbolic use of scorpions in his 1930 classic L'Age d'or (The Golden Age), while Stevie Smith's last collection of poems was entitled Scorpion and other Poems. A variety of martial arts films and video games have been entitled Scorpion King.

Since classical times, the scorpion with its powerful stinger has been used to provide a name for weapons. In the Roman army, the scorpio was a torsion siege engine used to shoot a projectile. The British Army's FV101 Scorpion was an armored reconnaissance vehicle or light tank in service from 1972 to 1994. A version of the Matilda II tank, fitted with a flail to clear mines, was named the Matilda Scorpion.
Several ships of the Royal Navy and of the US Navy have been named Scorpion including an 18-gun sloop in 1803, a turret ship in 1863, a patrol yacht in 1898, a destroyer in 1910, and a nuclear submarine in 1960.

The scorpion has served as the name or symbol of products and brands including Italy's Abarth racing cars and a Montesa scrambler motorcycle.
A hand- or forearm-balancing asana in modern yoga as exercise with the back arched and one or both legs pointing forward over the head in the manner of the scorpion's tail is called Scorpion pose.

Notes

References

Sources

External links

  American Museum of Natural History - Scorpion Systematics Research Group
 CDC – Insects and Scorpions – NIOSH Workplace Safety and Health Topic

 
Wenlock first appearances
Extant Silurian first appearances